Sébastien Maillard (born 2 May 1981, in Migennes) is a male hurdler from France.

He finished 5th in the 400m hurdles final at the 2006 European Athletics Championships in Gothenburg. He was a semi-finalist in the same event at the 2003 World Championships in Paris. As a junior, he competed in the decathlon.

Achievements

External links

1981 births
Living people
French male hurdlers
French decathletes
Mediterranean Games gold medalists for France
Mediterranean Games medalists in athletics
Athletes (track and field) at the 2005 Mediterranean Games
Athletes (track and field) at the 2009 Mediterranean Games
20th-century French people
21st-century French people